Susan Scannell (born February 24, 1958) is an American actress known for her roles in television soap operas.

Career
Scannell began as a model in New York with the Eileen Ford modelling agency, where her first booking resulted in being on the September 1978 cover of Seventeen.  She lived at the Rehearsal Club in Manhattan and also enjoyed singing in various clubs in Manhattan.

Scannell played Becky Hewitt on Another Life from 1981 to 1982, and Kristin Carter on Search for Tomorrow from 1982 to 1984. She next portrayed Nicole Simpson De Vilbis Colby on the prime time soap opera Dynasty from 1984 to 1985, followed by a stint as Chessy Blake/Gabrielle Dubujak on Ryan's Hope in 1985. She also appeared on One Life to Live (1986) and All My Children (1990, 1991), and had guest starring roles on The A-Team and Remington Steele.

Susan left Hollywood after a "me too" experience, moved to Astoria, NY, and was the founding executive director of The Astoria Performing Arts Center (www.apacny.org). In 2006 she moved to Massachusetts.

Personal life
Scannell is divorced from actor Christopher Roland, who had worked with her on Another Life playing Russ Weaver. She married Robert P. Gilbert on September 13, 2014 and formed Gilbert Entertainment after moving to Massachusetts in 2006.

References

External links
 
 

1958 births
American soap opera actresses
American television actresses
Living people
21st-century American women